Martina DaSilva is a jazz vocalist, composer and arranger.  In addition to being a leading member of the band The Ladybugs, DaSilva has worked with Jon Batiste, Postmodern Jukebox, Gunhild Carling and Bria Skonberg, among others.

Biography

Early life
Raised in New York City, DaSilva was born to a Brazilian father and American mother. She speaks fluent Portuguese. As a child, she performed in local musical theatre productions and eventually studied both classical music and jazz at Fiorello H. LaGuardia High School, graduating in 2009 (alongside Josh Holcomb, Zack O’Farrill, Adam O'Farrill, Joanna Sternberg, and others).

DaSilva initially attended McGill University in Montréal, but opted to return to New York City and complete her undergraduate degree at The New School for Jazz and Contemporary Music in 2011. She studied formally with Andres Andrade, Peter Eldridge and Neal Miner. During this time, DaSilva also became heavily involved in New York City's reburgeoning early jazz scene and performed regularly throughout the city as both a bandleader and vocalist.

Musical career
In 2013, DaSilva formed her band The Ladybugs through a chance encounter at the Hotel Chantelle in New York City's Lower East Side. While filling in for another vocalist at the hotel's rooftop restaurant, the venue's manager approached DaSilva and asked if she had a unique concept band that could perform regularly on Sundays. Although she had no such group at the time, she responded that she led an ‘’all-female 1920s band’’ named "The Ladybugs." She quickly assembled a group and initially performed as the band's sole vocalist before being joined by vocalist Kate Davis. The duo augmented with ukulele and snare drum, eventually integrating trombonists Joe McDonough and Rob Edwards and additional members on guitar and bass. Davis eventually left the group to pursue her solo work and was replaced by current frontline vocalist Vanessa Perea. Repertoire has included music from the 1920s, 1930s, 1940s and 1950s as well as songs drawn from DaSilva's and Perea's Latin-American heritage and Disney classics.

DaSilva was singled out as one of the most notable jazz vocalists of her generation in a 2015 article published by Vanity Fair.

In 2018, she was recruited by Scott Bradlee to join Postmodern Jukebox.  She has since performed globally with the group and has been notably featured on the group's single Beautiful (adapted from its original performance by Christina Aguilera).

DaSilva collaborated with acoustic bassist Dan Chmielinski in 2019 to compose, record, produce and release the holiday-inspired album A Very ChimyTina Christmas.  The recording primarily featured the pair in a duo format, but also included guest artists Lucas Pino, Ben Wolfe, Joel Ross and Gabe Schnider.  The album featured DaSilva's original song "Diamonds and Pearls" and a music video cover of Wham’s "Last Christmas." A Very ChimyTina Christmas received critical acclaim in the New York Times and Rolling Stone Magazine, among others.

DaSilva has been a frequent musical guest and contributor for Fireside Mystery Theatre, a podcast specializing in historical theatrical performances. She has also performed regularly with immersive-theatre troupe Little Cinema.

Discography

As leader

As guest

Personal life 
DaSilva is married to Lucky Chops trombonist Josh Holcomb.

References

External links 

Living people
American women jazz singers
American jazz singers
American people of Brazilian descent
Women jazz musicians
21st-century American women singers
21st-century American singers
Year of birth missing (living people)